WNJ may refer to:

Wilson N. Jones Regional Medical Center
Weird NJ
Warner Norcross & Judd